Launcells Cross is a hamlet in the parish of Launcells in Cornwall, England. It is on the B3254 road between Grimscott and Red Post.

References

Hamlets in Cornwall